Fred K. Baser (born November 4, 1947) is an American Republican politician. Since 2015 he serves as member of the Vermont House of Representatives from the Addison-4 district.

References

1947 births
Living people
People from Bristol, Vermont
Republican Party members of the Vermont House of Representatives
University of Vermont alumni
21st-century American politicians